Luther is an unincorporated community in Whitley and Huntington counties, in the U.S. state of Indiana.

It is located on Indiana State Road 5 between Huntington and South Whitley.

History

Luther was named after Myron Luther Pray, a local store owner.

A post office was established at Luther in 1894, and remained in operation until it was discontinued in 1905.

Geography

References

Unincorporated communities in Whitley County, Indiana
Unincorporated communities in Huntington County, Indiana
Unincorporated communities in Indiana